Brandon Dietrich (born March 22, 1978) is a Canadian professional ice hockey player. He is currently playing for EHC München in the Deutsche Eishockey Liga (DEL).

Prior to turning professional, Dietrich attended St. Lawrence University where he played two seasons of NCAA Division I men's ice hockey with the St. Lawrence Saints men's ice hockey team. For his outstanding play during the 1998–99 season he was named the ECAC Rookie of the Year.

Career Statistics

Awards and honours

References

External links

1978 births
Living people
Canadian ice hockey centres
Charlotte Checkers (1993–2010) players
EHC München players
Gwinnett Gladiators players
Hartford Wolf Pack players
Ice hockey people from Ontario
Manchester Monarchs (AHL) players
Sportspeople from Waterloo, Ontario
Reading Royals players
St. Lawrence Saints men's ice hockey players
Canadian expatriate ice hockey players in Germany
AHCA Division I men's ice hockey All-Americans